Kristine K. Kershul is an American author, publisher, linguist and teacher.  Kershul founded Bilingual Books, Inc. in 1981 with the publication of her first book, German in 10 Minutes a Day and the development of the 10 Minutes a Day Series.  She has authored books, audio, phrase guides and interactive computer software for 20 languages.

Background 

Kershul attributes her lifelong passion for languages to her family.  She grew up in a trilingual home where in addition to English, her father spoke Croatian and her mother spoke Danish.

Kershul studied in the U.S., then took her academic endeavors to Heidelberg, Germany where she earned her undergraduate and graduate degrees.  She received a second graduate degree from the University of California at Santa Barbara and then went on to do her doctoral studies in German Languages and Literature.

Early Career, 1971 - 1981 

Kershul worked her way through school as a bilingual tour guide, traveling all over Europe and parts of Asia and Africa.

She also served as a translator for the U.S. Embassy in Bonn, West Germany and for Berlitz in Europe and the U.S.
She spent ten years teaching at universities in Germany and the U.S. where she noticed students experiencing the same problems.  They were self-conscious speaking and Kershul wanted to help them progress to the level where they were laughing and using the language comfortably.

The idea for her first book grew out of what she observed as a teacher and a traveler.

Bilingual Books, 1981 - 1988 and 1995 - Present 

Kershul saw the need for a language instruction method that would not intimidate or frustrate beginning students.  She wanted to fill the gap between text books and traditional phrase books.  She developed a fresh approach to learning a foreign language, which remained academically solid while geared to the traveler.
In 1981 she designed and wrote her first book, German in 10 Minutes a Day, which was the beginning of a series of language-learning books that launched Bilingual Books, Inc.  By the end of the first ten months, Kershul had authored a total of five books, adding French, Spanish, Italian and Chinese to create the 10 Minutes a Day Series.  In the next three years, she would add Inglés, Norwegian, Japanese, Russian and Hebrew languages to the Series.

In 1988 Kershul sold her company to Sunset Books and Magazine.  She moved to Cape Town, South Africa and spent the next six years traveling around the world.

In 1995, Kershul reacquired Bilingual Books and moved back to the Pacific Northwest to base the company out of Seattle, Washington.  In the following years, she expanded the breadth of languages to 20 and added new product lines with the creation of the Language Map Series, the 10 Minutes a Day Audio Series, and the 10 Minutes a Day software.

Publications

10 Minutes a Day Book Series 

 ARABIC in 10 minutes a day
 CHINESE in 10 minutes a day
 FRENCH in 10 minutes a day
 GERMAN in 10 minutes a day
 HEBREW in 10 minutes a day
 INGLÉS en 10 minutos al día
 ITALIAN in 10 minutes a day
 JAPANESE in 10 minutes a day
 NORWEGIAN in 10 minutes a day
 PORTUGUESE in 10 minutes a day
 RUSSIAN in 10 minutes a day
 SPANISH in 10 minutes a day

10 Minutes a Day Audio Series 

 FRENCH in 10 minutes a day Book + Audio
 GERMAN in 10 minutes a day Book + Audio
 ITALIAN in 10 minutes a day Book + Audio
 SPANISH in 10 minutes a day Book + Audio

Language Map Series 

 ARABIC a language map
 CHINESE a language map
 DARI a language map
 FARSI a language map
 FRENCH a language map
 GERMAN a language map
 GREEK a language map
 HAWAIIAN a language map
 HEBREW a language map
 INGLÉS un mapa del lenguaje
 ITALIAN a language map
 JAPANESE a language map
 NORWEGIAN a language map
 PASHTO a language map
 POLISH a language map
 PORTUGUESE a language map
 RUSSIAN a language map
 SPANISH a language map
 SWAHILI a language map
 VIETNAMESE a language map

References 

Living people
Linguists from the United States
Women linguists
American publishers (people)
American education writers
Writers from Seattle
Year of birth missing (living people)